Vladimir Beketov (Russian: Владимир Андреевич Бекетов; born 3 March 1949) is a Russian politician who served as a senator from the Legislative Assembly of Krasnodar Krai from 2017 to 2022.

Vladimir Beketov is under personal sanctions introduced by the European Union, the United Kingdom, the USA, Canada, Switzerland, Australia, Ukraine, New Zealand, for ratifying the decisions of the "Treaty of Friendship, Cooperation and Mutual Assistance between the Russian Federation and the Donetsk People's Republic and between the Russian Federation and the Luhansk People's Republic" and providing political and economic support for Russia's annexation of Ukrainian territories.

Biography

Vladimir Beketov was born on 17 August 1959 in Uspensky District, Krasnodar Krai. In 1976, he graduated from the Kuban State Agrarian University. In 1967, he served in the Soviet navy. Afterwards, he worked in the local kolkhoz. From 1975 to 1980, he was the second secretary of the Uspenskii district of the Komsomol. In 1992, he became the deputy of the Council of People's Deputies of the Krasnodar Krai. From 1991 to 1995, he was the head of the Uspensky District administration. On November 20, 1994, he was elected to the Legislative Assembly of Krasnodar Krai of the 1st convocation. On 2 December 2007, Beketov became the deputy of the Legislative Assembly of the IV convocation for the Eastern District. On 28 September 2017, he became the senator from the Legislative Assembly of Krasnodar Krai On 16 September 2022, Beketov early terminated his duties. 

As of October 2022, Beketov was a vice-speaker of the Legislative Assembly of Krasnodar Krai.

References

Living people
1949 births
United Russia politicians
21st-century Russian politicians
People from Uspensky District
Members of the Federation Council of Russia (after 2000)